Bruno Scolari (29 January 1961 – 28 April 2009) was an Italian equestrian. He competed in two events at the 1984 Summer Olympics.

References

External links
 

1961 births
2009 deaths
Italian male equestrians
Olympic equestrians of Italy
Equestrians at the 1984 Summer Olympics
Sportspeople from Monza